The  is a city tram station on the Takaoka Kidō Line located in Takaoka, Toyama Prefecture, Japan. The station is sometimes called .

Structure
Kataharamachi Station has two tracks with side platforms on street level.

Adjacent stations

Railway stations in Toyama Prefecture